Hôrka nad Váhom is a village and municipality in Nové Mesto nad Váhom District in the Trenčín Region of western Slovakia.

History
In historical records the village was first mentioned in 1426.

Geography
The municipality lies at an altitude of 193 metres and covers an area of 18.319 km2. It has a population of about 680 people.

Genealogical resources

The records for genealogical research are available at the state archive "Statny Archiv in Bratislava, Slovakia"

 Roman Catholic church records (births/marriages/deaths): 1719-1907 (parish B)
 Lutheran church records (births/marriages/deaths): 1811-1942 (parish B)

See also
 List of municipalities and towns in Slovakia

References

External links

  Official page
https://web.archive.org/web/20070427022352/http://www.statistics.sk/mosmis/eng/run.html
Surnames of living people in Horka nad Vahom

Villages and municipalities in Nové Mesto nad Váhom District